Indira Vizha is a 2009 Indian Tamil-language romantic thriller film directed by K. Rajeshwar, starring Srikanth, Namitha, and Shruti Marathe, with Nassar, Vivek, Ragasya, Radha Ravi, and Y. G. Mahendra in supporting roles. The music was composed by newcomer Yatish Mahadev. It began its first schedule on 11 February 2008 and was released on 10 July 2009.

The movie revolves around sexual harassment at work. It is loosely based on the Hindi film Aitraaz, which itself was based on the Hollywood movie Disclosure.

Plot
The film tells the story of Kamini (Namitha), who plans to get back at her ex-lover Santhosh Srinivasan (Srikanth) by re-entering his life as the wife of his boss John Kumaramangalam alias JK (Nassar). Santhosh is the creative head of a television channel called Teen TV (though it does indulge in political exposés). He is married to Savithri Duraisimaalu (Shruti Marathe), and his life turns topsy-turvy when JK reinstates Kamini as the head of the TV channel, a promotion that Santhosh had anticipated for himself. Following this, it is the simple story with Kamini starting to hurl sexual harassment accusations at Santhosh.

Cast

Production
The actor Raghuvaran had been signed up and completed a photo shoot for the film. He died during the production of the movie and was replaced by Nassar. Actress Malavika nee Swetha Kunnur Menon was roped in as the female lead and she backed out citing her wedding and harassment on the sets. She was then replaced by Shruthi.

Soundtrack
The soundtrack was composed by the debutant Yathish Mahadev with lyrics by Vairamuthu.
"Mogamma" — Hariharan, Sujatha
"Oru Kinnathai" — M. K. Balaji, Priyadarshini
"Kashmir Konduva" — Yatish, Anushka Manchanda
"Naan Oru" — Sayanora Philip, Megha

Reception
Behindwoods wrote, "Indira Vizha is a movie that might leave one feeling despondent about the fact that even while brave film makers are coming out with neat and quality movies, such products find their way into theaters." The Times of India wrote, "With so much meat, all you need is a simple, no-nonsense screenplay. However, the director changes track frequently, delving into comedy which is as crisp as yesterday's papadam left on the dining table." The Hindu wrote, "An ably fractured screenplay leaves Indira Vizha tottering even before it can take off."

References

External links
 

2009 films
2000s Tamil-language films
Indian courtroom films
Films about sexual harassment
Indian erotic thriller films
2000s erotic thriller films
Films directed by K. Rajeshwar
Films scored by Yatish Mahadev